Manifestis Probatum is a papal bull dated 23 May 1179, in which Pope Alexander III officially recognised the ruler and self-proclaimed king Afonso Henriques as the first sovereign King of Portugal.

The Papacy did not at first recognize the legitimacy of Afonso's adoption of the royal title in 1139, instead continuing to regard him as a vassal of the kingdom of León. The switch in papal policy in 1179 was justified by Afonso's reconquest of lands to the south of the Iberian Peninsula to which no other Christian monarch had claim.

Text
Alexander, Bishop, Servant of the servants of God, to the most beloved son in Christ, Afonso, Illustrious King of the Portuguese, and to his heirs, in perpetuity:

It is clearly demonstrated that, as a good son and catholic prince, you have rendered innumerable services to your mother, the Holy Church, intrepidly exterminating through hardships and military prowess the enemies of the Christian name and diligently propagating the Christian faith, thereby leaving to generations still unborn a name worthy of memory and an example deserving of imitation. The Apostolic See must love with sincere affection and strive to efficiently attend, in their just petitions, those chosen by the divine Providence for the government and salvation of the people.

We, therefore, because of your qualities of prudence, justice and idoneity for government, take you under the protection of Saint Peter and our own, and grant and confirm by apostolic authority to your excellent domain, the Kingdom of Portugal, full honours of kingdom and the dignity that befits kings, as well as all places which, with the help of the Celestial Grace, you have wrested from the hands of the Saracens, and to which your neighbouring Christian princes may not claim any rights.

And so that your devotion and service to Saint Peter, Prince of the Apostles, and to the Holy Roman Church is further aroused, We decide to extend this same concession to your heirs and, with the help of God, We promise to defend it for them, as far as our apostolic magistrature is concerned. Do continue, therefore, to show yourself a beloved son, humble and devoted to the honour and service of your mother, the Holy Roman Church, and to defend Her interests by spreading the Christian faith in such a way that this Apostolic See may take joy in having such a devoted and glorious son whose affection cannot be in doubt.

As tangible representation that said kingdom belongs to Saint Peter, you have determined as a testimony of great reverence to surrender annually two marks of gold to Us and Our successors. You and your successors will endeavour, therefore, to consign to the Archbishop of Braga pro tempore this census that belongs to Us and Our successors.

We determine accordingly that it is unlawful for any man to brazenly cause any trouble to you or your heirs or your kingdom, or to seize anything that belongs to it or, in the case it has been seized, to keep it, debase it, or cause any torment to it.

If anyone, in future, whether ecclesiastic or secular person, willingly challenges that which has been determined under this Constitution without presenting suitable satisfaction after a second or a third admonition, may they be stripped of the dignity of their honour and power, forelearn that they will be held accountable for their iniquity before the Divine Judgement, and be excluded from the Communion of the Most Holy Body and Blood of Jesus Christ, our divine Lord and Redeemer. May the peace of Our Lord Jesus Christ be with all those who respect the rights of this kingdom and their king, so that they may gather the fruit of good works in this world and the reward of eternal peace before the Severe Judge. Amen. Amen.

Peter, Paul, Alexander PP. III
Bene valete

See also
Portugal
History of Portugal
Timeline of Portuguese history

References

External links
Fac simile of Manifestis Probatum in the National Archive of the Tower of the Tombo
Philipp Jaffé, Regesta pontificum Romanorum ab condita Ecclesia ad annum post Christum natum MCXCVIII, Berlin 1851

1179 in Europe
12th century in Portugal
1179 works
12th-century papal bulls
Documents of Pope Alexander III
Holy See–Portugal relations